Gollaprolu mandal is one of the 21 mandals in Kakinada District of Andhra Pradesh. As per census 2011, there are 10 villages.

Demographics 
Gollaprolu mandal has total population of 78,926 as per the 2011 Census out of which 39,773 are males while 39,153 are females and the average sex ratio is 984. The total literacy rate is 61.97%. The male literacy rate is 58.35% and the female literacy rate is 52.03%.

Towns and villages

Villages 

Chebrolu
Chendurthi
China Jaggampeta
Durgada
Gollaprolu
Kodavali
Mallavaram
Tatiparthi
Vannepudi
Vijayanagaram

See also 
List of mandals in Andhra Pradesh

References 

Mandals in Kakinada district
Mandals in Andhra Pradesh